York Franciscan Friary was a friary in York, North Yorkshire, England.  It was located between York Castle and the River Ouse.  In 1538, it fell victim to Henry VIII's Dissolution of the Monasteries. All that now remains of it is a stone wall on King's Staith, adjacent to the Davy Tower on the York city walls.

Burials
Robert de Neville
Thomas de Mowbray, 4th Earl of Norfolk

References

Monasteries in North Yorkshire
History of York
1538 disestablishments in England
Franciscan monasteries in England